This is the electoral history of Elizabeth Warren, the senior United States senator from Massachusetts since 2013. A Democrat, she was a candidate in the 2020 United States presidential election.

United States Senate elections

2012

2018

References 

Elizabeth Warren
Warren, Elizabeth
Warren, Elizabeth